Before The Next Teardrop Falls is an album by Freddy Fender.

His first album, it was released in 1974. The album includes the number-one hits "Before the Next Teardrop Falls" and "Wasted Days and Wasted Nights". It peaked at No. 20 on the Billboard 200.

Production
The album was produced by Huey P. Meaux, on the recommendation of Doug Sahm.

Track listing
 "Roses Are Red (My Love)" (Paul Evans, Al Byron) – 3:10 
 "I'm Not a Fool Anymore" (Robert Thibodeau) – 2:32
 "Please Don't Tell Me How the Story Ends" (Kris Kristofferson) – 2:35
 "You Can't Get Here from There" (Glenn Barber) – 2:56
 "I Love My Rancho Grande" (Freddy Fender) – 2:51
 "Wasted Days and Wasted Nights" (Wayne Duncan, Fender, Huey P Meaux) – 2:52
 "I Almost Called Your Name" (Margaret Lewis, Myra Smith) – 2:30
 "Before the Next Teardrop Falls" (Vivian Keith, Ben Peters) – 2:30
 "The Wild Side of Life" (Arlie Carter, William Warren) – 3:08
 "After the Fire Is Gone" (L.E. White) – 2:56
 "Then You Can Tell Me Goodbye" (John D. Loudermilk) – 2:15

Charts

Weekly charts

Year-end charts

Personnel
 Freddy Fender – vocals
 Randy Cornor – guitar
 Donny King – bass
 Chester Vaughn – drums
Special note:
"Before the Next Teardrop Falls"
Bajo Sexto - Armando Lichtenberger Sr / 
Accordion - Silverio "Lefty" Cardenas

References

Freddy Fender albums
1974 debut albums
Dot Records albums